The boys' single skating competition of the 2020 Winter Youth Olympics was held at the Lausanne Skating Arena on 10 January (short program) and 12 January 2020 (free skating).

Results

Short program 
The short program was held on 10 January at 16:00.

Free skating 
The free skating was held on 12 January at 14:00.

Overall

References 

Boys' singles